Benjamin Franklin is a 2022 two-part American documentary film directed and produced by Ken Burns that first aired on PBS on April 4 and 5, 2022. The film chronicles the life of Benjamin Franklin, a polymath and Founding Father of the United States. The film is narrated by Peter Coyote and Mandy Patinkin stars as the voice of Franklin. Other voice actors starring in the film include Josh Lucas, Liam Neeson, and Paul Giamatti.

Episodes
 Episode One: "Join or Die" (1706–1774)
 Episode Two: "An American" (1775-1790)

Cast
 Peter Coyote as the narrator
 Mandy Patinkin as Benjamin Franklin
 Josh Lucas as William Franklin
 Paul Giamatti as John Adams
 Liam Neeson as a House of Commons member Alexander Wedderburn
 Carolyn McCormick as Deborah Franklin
 Joe Morton as William Bradford
 Adam Arkin as Elkanah Watson
 Dave Quay as Daniel Defoe
 Tony Beck as Marquis de Lafayette

References

External links
 

Cultural depictions of Benjamin Franklin
Cultural depictions of John Adams
Films directed by Ken Burns
Documentary films about American politics
Documentary films about United States history
2022 films
2022 television films
2022 documentary films
2020s American films